Shengsi County is a county in the northeast of Zhejiang province consisting of an archipelago islands located to the east of Hangzhou Bay. It is under the administration of Zhoushan City and is the easternmost county-level division in the province. The islands of Greater and Lesser Yangshan are connected with Shanghai's Pudong New Area by the Donghai Bridge and their port forms part of the Port of Shanghai. They are, however, not counted among the islands of Shanghai.

The county consists of 630 islands and islets, of which 13 have more than 100 inhabitants.

Administrative divisions
Towns:
Caiyuan (菜园镇), Shengshan (嵊山镇), Yangshan (洋山镇)

Townships:
Wulong Township (五龙乡), Huanglong Township (黄龙乡), Gouqi Township (枸杞乡), Huadao Township (花鸟乡)

Climate

See also
 Shengsi Islands

References

County-level divisions of Zhejiang
Island counties of China
Zhoushan